Predrag Šimić (born June 26, 1979) is a Bosnian-Herzegovinian retired footballer.

International career
He made one appearance for Bosnia and Herzegovina, coming on as a second half substitute for Vladan Grujić in an April 2004 friendly match against Finland.

References

External links 
 

1979 births
Living people
Footballers from Sarajevo
Association football defenders
Association football midfielders
Bosnia and Herzegovina footballers
Bosnia and Herzegovina international footballers
FK Željezničar Sarajevo players
NK Zagreb players
NK Široki Brijeg players
HŠK Zrinjski Mostar players
HNK Hajduk Split players
NK Maribor players
Niki Volos F.C. players
Rodos F.C. players
RNK Split players
Croatian Football League players
Premier League of Bosnia and Herzegovina players
Slovenian PrvaLiga players
Football League (Greece) players
Gamma Ethniki players
Bosnia and Herzegovina expatriate footballers
Expatriate footballers in Croatia
Bosnia and Herzegovina expatriate sportspeople in Croatia
Expatriate footballers in Slovenia
Bosnia and Herzegovina expatriate sportspeople in Slovenia
Expatriate footballers in Greece
Bosnia and Herzegovina expatriate sportspeople in Greece